Youngest of da Camp is the debut studio album by American rapper Lil Boosie. It was released in 2000, by C-Loc Records. The album's production was mainly handled by Happy Perez, Russ Lee and C-Loc himself. C-Loc was also listed as one of the album's featured guest appearances, along with Max Minelli, Concentration Camp and Donkey. Youngest of da Camp has sold 10,000 units in the United States.

Background
Lil Boosie's cousin, C-Loc started his own record company, called C-Loc Records. At the time, Lil Boosie was 17 years old, during the recording of this album. The album involves the most of the productions from his cousin C-Loc.

Artwork
The album's artwork was designed by Pen and Pixel Graphics. The company's design art compares with other major New Orleans record labels; including Cash Money Records and No Limit Records, which those album art that they also created at the time.

Track listing

References

Lil Boosie albums
Albums produced by Happy Perez
2000 debut albums